Wonosari is the administrative centre of Gunung Kidul Regency, in the Special Region of Yogyakarta on Java, Indonesia. Wonosari District is bordered to the north by the district of Nglipar, to the east by the districts of Karangmojo and Semanu, to the south by the district of Tanjungsari, and to the west by the districts of Paliyan and Playen (to the west of Yogyakarta). It had a population of 87,454 as of 2020 Census.

Education
There are many schools in the town of Wonosari. The most popular ones are Wonosari Baru Elementary School, Wonosari 1 Junior High School, and Wonosari 1 High School. There is also Wonosari 2 High School. The education level is mid-high depends on the school quality (like the teacher ability, the student's impact, facility, etc.)
The schools in Wonosari are mostly managed by Disdikpora Gunungkidul or Dinas Pendidikan dan Olahraga Gunungkidul, located in Jl. Pemuda No.227, Rejosari, Wonosari, Kec. Wonosari, Kabupaten Gunung Kidul, Daerah Istimewa Yogyakarta 55851.

Climate
Wonosari has a tropical monsoon climate (Am) with moderate to little rainfall from June to October and heavy to very heavy rainfall from November to May.

References

Districts of the Special Region of Yogyakarta
Gunung Kidul Regency
Regency seats of the Special Region of Yogyakarta

google.com